The spur-throated locust (Austracris guttulosa) is a native Australian locust species in the family Acrididae and a significant agricultural pest.

Adults are pale brown with colourless wings and white and dark markings on the thorax. The hind legs are yellow with two rows of white spines. Juvenile spur-throated locusts are green or yellow. The backs of older juveniles may also show a dark or pale stripe.

The spur-throated locust has a life span on between ten and 12 months, from autumn to summer. Overpopulation of spur-throated locusts is managed in Australia by the Australian Plague Locust Commission.

See also

Australian plague locust, Chortoicetes terminifera – another plague locust in Australia

References

Acrididae
Orthoptera of Australia
Insects described in 1870